Barium Springs is an unincorporated community in Iredell County, North Carolina, United States. The community is located on the northern border of Troutman along U.S. Route 21. Barium Springs has a post office, with ZIP code 28010.

Native Americans named the area Poison Springs, which later became the name of the community's first post office. After a mineral spa opened there in the 1880s, the community changed its name to emphasize the medicinal properties of the barium and other minerals in its waters.

Barium Springs is the site of the Barium Springs Home for Children, a home for disadvantaged and troubled children.

References

Unincorporated communities in Iredell County, North Carolina
Unincorporated communities in North Carolina